Louisiana Creoles are people descended from the inhabitants of colonial Louisiana before it became a part of the United States during the period of both French and Spanish rule. As an ethnic group, their ancestry is mainly of Louisiana French, West African, Spanish and Native American origin. Louisiana Creoles share cultural ties such as the traditional use of the French, Spanish, and Creole languages and predominant practice of Catholicism.

The term Créole was originally used by the Louisiana French to distinguish people born in Louisiana from those born elsewhere, thus drawing a distinction between Old-World Europeans and Africans from their Creole descendants born in the New World. The word is not a racial label and does not imply mixed racial origins—people of any race can and have identified as Louisiana Creoles. 

Créole was used as an identity in Louisiana from the 18th century onward. After the Sale of Louisiana, the term "Creole" took on a more political meaning and identity, especially for those people of Latinate culture. Whether white or black, these francophone Catholics had a culture that contrasted with the Anglo-Protestant culture of the new American settlers—and their slaves—from the Upper South and the North.

Although Cajuns are often presented as being distinct from the Creoles, this distinction is not historically accurate and may be contested today; people of Cajun ancestry are often listed in historic documents as Creoles. Today, some Louisianians identify exclusively as either Cajun or Creole, while others embrace both identities.

Creoles of French descent, including those of Québécois or Acadian lineage, have historically comprised the majority of white-identified Creoles in Louisiana. Later 19th-century immigrants to Louisiana, such as Irish, Germans and Italians, also married into the Creole group. Most of these immigrants were Catholic.

New Orleans in particular has retained a significant historical population of Creoles of color, a group mostly consisting of free persons of multiracial European, African, and Native American descent. With many Creoles of color having received superior rights and education under Spain & France than did their Anglo-American counterparts, some of the United States' earliest writers, poets and activists of color (e.g. Victor Séjour, Rodolphe Desdunes and Homère Plessy) were Louisiana Creoles. Today, many Creoles of color have assimilated into African-American culture, while others remain a separate yet inclusive subsection of the African-American ethnic group. 

In the twentieth century, the gens de couleur libres in Louisiana became increasingly associated with the term Creole, in part because Anglo-Americans struggled with the idea of an ethno-cultural identity not founded in race. One historian has described this period as the "Americanization of Creoles," including an acceptance of the American binary racial system that divided Creoles between white and black. (See Creoles of color for a detailed analysis of this event.) Concurrently, the number of white-identified Creoles has dwindled, with many adopting the Cajun label instead.

While the sophisticated Creole society of New Orleans has historically received much attention, the Cane River area in northwest Louisiana—populated chiefly by Creoles of color—also developed its own strong Creole culture. 

Today, most Creoles are found in the Greater New Orleans region or in Acadiana. Louisiana is known as the Creole State.

History

First French period

Through both the French and Spanish (late 18th century) regimes, parochial and colonial governments used the term Creole for ethnic French and Spanish people born in the New World as opposed to Europe. Parisian French was the predominant language among colonists in early New Orleans.

Later the regional French evolved to contain local phrases and slang terms. The French Creoles spoke what became known as Colonial French. Because of isolation, the language in the colony developed differently from that in France. It was spoken by the ethnic French and Spanish and their Creole descendants.

The commonly accepted definition of Louisiana Creole today is a person descended from ancestors in Louisiana before the Louisiana Purchase by the United States in 1803. An estimated 7,000 European immigrants settled in Louisiana during the 18th century, one percent of the number of European colonists in the Thirteen Colonies along the Atlantic coast. Louisiana attracted considerably fewer French colonists than did its West Indian colonies. 

After the crossing of the Atlantic Ocean, which lasted more than two months, the colonists had numerous challenges ahead of them in the Louisiana frontier. Their living conditions were difficult: uprooted, they had to face a new, often hostile, environment, with difficult climate and tropical diseases. Many of these immigrants died during the maritime crossing or soon after their arrival.

Hurricanes, unknown in France, periodically struck the coast, destroying whole villages. The Mississippi Delta was plagued with periodic yellow fever epidemics. Europeans also brought the Eurasian diseases of malaria and cholera, which flourished along with mosquitoes and poor sanitation. These conditions slowed colonization. Moreover, French villages and forts were not always sufficient to protect from enemy offensives. Attacks by Native Americans represented a real threat to the groups of isolated colonists. 

The Natchez massacred 250 colonists in Lower Louisiana in retaliation for encroachment by French settlers. The Natchez warriors took Fort Rosalie (now Natchez, Mississippi) by surprise, killing many settlers. During the next two years, the French attacked the Natchez in return, causing them to flee or, when captured, be deported as slaves to their Caribbean colony of Saint-Domingue (later Haiti).

In the colonial period of French and Spanish rule, men tended to marry later after becoming financially established. French settlers frequently took Native American women as their wives (see Marriage 'à la façon du pays'), and as slaves began to be imported into the colony, settlers also took African wives. Intermarriage between the different groups of Louisiana created a large multiracial Creole population.

Engagés and Casquette Girls

Aside from French government representatives and soldiers, colonists included mostly young men who were recruited in French ports or in Paris. Some labored as engagés (indentured servants), i.e. "temporary semi-slaves"; they were required to remain in Louisiana for a length of time, fixed by the contract of service, to pay back the cost of passage and board. Engagés in Louisiana generally worked for seven years, and their masters provided them housing, food, and clothing. They were often housed in barns and performed hard labor. 

Starting in 1698, French merchants were obliged to transport a number of men to the colonies in proportion to the ships' tonnage. Some of the men brought over were engaged on three-year indenture contracts under which the contract-holder would be responsible for their "vital needs" as well as provide a salary at the end of the contract term. Under John Law and the Compagnie du Mississippi, efforts to increase the use of engagés in the colony were made, notably including German settlers whose contracts were absolved when the company went bankrupt in 1731.

During this time, to increase the colonial population, the government also recruited young Frenchwomen, known as filles à la cassette (in English, casket girls, referring to the casket or case of belongings they brought with them) to go to the colony to be wed to colonial soldiers. The king financed dowries for each girl. (This practice was similar to events in 17th-century Quebec: about 800 filles du roi (daughters of the king) were recruited to immigrate to New France under the monetary sponsorship of Louis XIV.)

In addition, French authorities deported some female criminals to the colony.  For example, in 1721, the ship La Baleine brought close to 90 women of childbearing age from the prison of La Salpêtrière in Paris to Louisiana. Most of the women quickly found husbands among the male residents of the colony. These women, many of whom were most likely prostitutes or felons, were known as The Baleine Brides. Such events inspired Manon Lescaut (1731), a novel written by the Abbé Prévost, which was later adapted as an opera in the 19th century.

Historian Joan Martin maintains that there is little documentation that casket girls (considered among the ancestors of French Creoles) were transported to Louisiana. (The Ursuline order of nuns, who were said to chaperone the girls until they married, have denied the casket girl myth as well.) Martin suggests this account was mythical. The system of plaçage that continued into the 19th century resulted in many young white men having women of color as partners and mothers of their children, often before or even after their marriages to white women. French Louisiana also included communities of Swiss and German settlers; however, royal authorities did not refer to "Louisianans" but described the colonial population as "French" citizens.

French Indians in Louisiana

New France wished to make Native Americans subjects of the king and good Christians, but the distance from Metropolitan France and the sparseness of French settlement prevented this. In official rhetoric, the Native Americans were regarded as subjects of the Viceroyalty of New France, but in reality, they were largely autonomous due to their numerical superiority. The local authorities of New France (governors, officers) did not have the human resources to establish French law and customs, and instead often compromised with the Indians. 

Indian tribes offered essential support for the French: they ensured the survival of New France's colonists, participated with them in the fur trade, and acted as guides in expeditions. The French alliance with Indians also provided mutual protection from hostile non-allied tribes and incursions on French & Indian land from enemy European powers. The French & Indian alliance proved invaluable during the later French and Indian War against the New England colonies in 1753.

The French & Indians influenced each other in many fields: the French settlers learned the languages of the natives, such as Mobilian Jargon, a Choctaw-based Creole language that served as a trade language in use among the French and various Indian tribes in the region. The Indians bought European goods (fabric, alcohol, firearms, etc.), learned French, and sometimes adopted their religion.

The coureurs des bois and soldiers borrowed canoes and moccasins. Many of them ate native food such as wild rice and various meats, like bear and dog. The colonists were often dependent on the Native Americans for food. Creole cuisine is the heir of these mutual influences: thus, sagamité, for example, is a mix of corn pulp, bear fat and bacon. Today jambalaya, a word of Seminole origin, refers to a multitude of recipes calling for meat and rice, all very spicy. Sometimes shamans succeeded in curing the colonists thanks to traditional remedies, such as the application of fir tree gum on wounds and Royal Fern on rattlesnake bites.

Many French colonists both admired and feared the military power of the Native Americans, though some governors from France scorned their culture and wanted to keep racial purity between the whites and Indians. In 1735, interracial marriages without the approval of the authorities were prohibited in Louisiana. However, by the 1750's in New France, the idea of the Native Americans became one of the "Noble Savage," that Indians were spiritually pure and played an important role in the natural purity of the New World. Native Americans did marry French settlers, with Indian women being consistently considered as good wives to foster trade and help create offspring. Their intermarriage created a large métis (mixed French Indian) population In New France. 

In spite of some disagreements (some Indians killed farmers' pigs, which devastated corn fields), and sometimes violent confrontations (Fox Wars, Natchez uprisings, and expeditions against the Chicachas), the relationship with the Native Americans was relatively good in Louisiana. French imperialism was expressed through some wars and the slavery of some Native Americans. But most of the time, the relationship was based on dialogue and negotiation.

Africans in Louisiana

Inability to find labor was the most pressing issue in Louisiana. In 1717, John Law, the French Comptroller General of Finances, decided to import African slaves into Louisiana. His objective was to develop the plantation economy of Lower Louisiana. The Royal Indies Company held a monopoly over the slave trade in the area. The colonists turned to sub-Saharan African slaves to make their investments in Louisiana profitable. In the late 1710s the transatlantic slave trade imported slaves into the colony. This led to the biggest shipment in 1716 where several trading ships appeared with slaves as cargo to the local residents in a one-year span.

Between 1723 and 1769, most slaves imported to Louisiana were from modern day Senegal, Mali and Congo. A large number of the imported slaves from the Senegambia region were members of the Wolof and Bambara ethnic groups. During the Spanish control of Louisiana, between 1770 and 1803, most of the slaves still came from the Congo and the Senegambia region but they also imported more slaves from modern-day Benin. Other ethnic groups imported during this period included members of the Nago people, a Yoruba subgroup.

In Louisiana, the term Bambara was used as a generic term for African slaves. European traders used Bambara as a term for defining vaguely a region of ethnic origin. Muslim traders and interpreters often used Bambara to indicate Non-Muslim captives. Slave traders would sometimes identify their slaves as Bambara in hopes of securing a higher price, as Bambara slaves were sometimes characterized as being more passive. Further confusing the name's indication of ethnic, linguistic, religious, or other implications, the concurrent Bambara Empire had notoriety for its practice of slave-capturing wherein Bambara soldiers would raid neighbors and capture the young men of other ethnic groups, forcibly assimilate them, and turn them into slave soldiers known as Ton. The Bambara Empire depended on war-captives to replenish and increase its numbers; many of the people who called themselves Bambara were indeed not ethnic Bambara.

Code Noir and Affranchis

Africans contributed to the creolization of Louisiana society. They brought okra from Africa, a plant common in the preparation of gumbo. While the Code Noir required that the slaves receive baptism and Christian education, many continued to practice animism and often combined elements of the two faiths.

The Code Noir conferred affranchis (ex-slaves) full citizenship and gave complete civil equality with other French subjects.

Louisiana slave society generated its own distinct Afro-Creole culture that was present in religious beliefs and the Louisiana Creole language.  The slaves brought with them their cultural practices, languages, and religious beliefs rooted in spirit and ancestor worship, as well as Roman Catholic Christianity—all of which were key elements of Louisiana Voodoo. In addition, in the early nineteenth century, many St. Dominicans also settled in Louisiana, both free people of color and slaves, following the Haitian Revolution on Saint-Domingue, contributing to the Voodoo tradition of the state. During the American period (1804-1820), almost half of the slaves came from the Congo.

Spanish period

In the final stages of the French and Indian War with the New England colonies, New France ceded the Louisiana to Spain in the secret Treaty of Fontainebleau (1762). The Spanish were slow and reluctant to fully occupy the colony, however, and did not do so until 1769. That year, Spain abolished Native American slavery. In addition, Spanish liberal manumission policies contributed to the growth of the population of Creoles of color, particularly in New Orleans. Nearly all of the surviving 18th-century architecture of the Vieux Carré (French Quarter) dates from the Spanish period (the Ursuline Convent an exception). These buildings were designed by French architects, as there were no Spanish architects in Louisiana. The buildings of the French Quarter are of a Mediterranean style also found in southern France.

Spanish Louisiana's multiracial Creole descendants, which included affranchis (ex-slaves), free-born blacks, and mixed-race people, known as Creoles of color (gens de couleur libres), were strongly influenced by French Catholic culture. By the end of the 18th century, many Creoles of color were educated and tended to work in artisan or skilled trades; a relatively high number were property owners. Many Creoles of color were free-born, and their descendants often enjoyed many of the same privileges as whites while under Spanish rule, including (but not limited to) property ownership, formal education, and service in the militia. Indeed, Creoles of color had been members of the militia for decades under both French and Spanish control of the colony of Louisiana. For example, around 80 Creoles of color were recruited into the militia that participated in the Battle of Baton Rouge in 1779.

Throughout the Spanish period, most Creoles continued to speak French and remained strongly connected to French colonial culture. However, the sizeable Spanish Creole communities of Saint Bernard Parish and Galveztown spoke Spanish. The Malagueños of New Iberia spoke Spanish as well. (Since the mid-20th century, the number of Spanish-speaking Creoles has declined in favor of English speakers. Even today, however, the Isleños of St. Bernard Parish have maintained cultural traditions from the Canary Islands.)

Cajuns and Isleños in Louisiana

In 1765, during Spanish rule, several thousand Acadians from the French colony of Acadia (now Nova Scotia, New Brunswick, and Prince Edward Island) made their way to Louisiana after having been expelled from Acadia by the British government after the French and Indian War. They settled chiefly in the southwestern Louisiana region now called Acadiana. The governor Luis de Unzaga y Amézaga, eager to gain more settlers, welcomed the Acadians, who became the ancestors of Louisiana's Cajuns.

Spanish Canary Islanders, called Isleños, emigrated from the Canary Islands of Spain to Louisiana under the Spanish crown between 1778 and 1783. In 1800, France's Napoleon Bonaparte reacquired Louisiana from Spain in the Treaty of San Ildefonso, an arrangement kept secret for two years.

2nd French period, the Sale of Louisiana

Spain ceded Louisiana back to France in 1800 through the Third Treaty of San Ildefonso, although it remained under nominal Spanish control until 1803. Weeks after reasserting full control over the territory, Napoleon sold Louisiana to the United States in the wake of the defeat of his forces in Saint-Domingue, which Napoleon had been trying to regain control of Saint-Domingue following the St. Dominican Rebellion and subsequent Haitian Revolution. After the Purchase, many Anglo-Americans migrated to Louisiana. Later European immigrants included Irish, Germans, and Italians.

St. Dominican refugees in Louisiana

In the early 19th century, floods of St. Dominican refugees fled from Saint-Domingue and poured into New Orleans, nearly tripling the city's population. Indeed, more than half of the refugee population of Saint-Domingue settled in Louisiana. Thousands of St. Dominican refugees, both white and Creole of color, arrived in New Orleans, sometimes bringing slaves with them. While Governor Claiborne and other Anglo-American officials wanted to keep out additional free black men, the Louisiana Creoles wanted to increase the French-speaking Creole population. As more refugees were allowed in Louisiana, St. Dominican refugees who had first gone to Cuba also arrived. Officials in Cuba deported many of the St. Dominican refugees in retaliation for Bonapartist schemes in Spain.

Nearly 90 percent of early 19th century immigrants to the territory settled in New Orleans. The 1809 deportation of St. Dominicans from Cuba brought 2,731 whites, 3,102 Creoles of color and 3,226 slaves, which, in total, doubled the city's population. The city became 63 percent black in population, a greater proportion than Charleston, South Carolina's 53 percent.

The Dominican Creoles' specialized population raised Louisiana's level of culture and industry, and was one of the reasons why Louisiana was able to gain statehood so quickly. Here is a quote from a Louisiana Creole who remarked on the rapid development of his homeland:

St. Dominican controversy

American authorities initially forbade access of slaves into Louisiana. However, some concessions were made to fleeing St. Dominican refugees, especially after the 1804 Haiti Massacre. In 1804, Jean-Jacques Dessalines decreed that all Creoles of color and freed slaves deemed traitors to the Haitian Empire should be put to death. He ordered that all whites in Haiti should also be exterminated, with few exceptions. Many of the slaves who accompanied St. Dominican refugees came willingly, as they feared the bloodshed, murder, pillaging, lawlessness, and economic collapse in Saint-Domingue. Here is a letter from a fleeing St. Dominican about his petition for asylum to the American government on behalf of his servants in Saint-Domingue:

When St. Dominican refugees arrived with slaves, they often followed the old Creole custom, liberté des savanes (savannah liberty), where the owner allowed their slaves to be free to find work at their own convenience in exchange for a flat weekly or monthly rate. They often became domestics, cooks, wig makers, and coachmen.

Although St. Dominicans remained concentrated in the city of New Orleans, about 10% of them<ref name="AAM" very slowly scattered into surrounding parishes. There, manual labor for agriculture was in greatest demand. The scarcity of slaves made Creole planters turn to petits habitants (Creole peasants), and immigrant indentured servitude (engagés) to supply manual labor; they complimented paid labor with slave labor. On many plantations, free people of color and whites toiled side-by-side with slaves. This multi-class state of affairs converted many minds to the abolition of slavery.

The large, rich families of old Saint-Domingue were almost nowhere to be found in Louisiana. Indeed, the majority of St. Dominican refugees who made a mark on 19th century Louisiana and Louisiana Creole culture came from the lower classes of Saint-Domingue, such as Louis Moreau Gottschalk's and Rodolphe Desdunes' family.

American fears of the St. Dominican refugees
Anglo-Americans harbored much hostility towards the St. Dominican refugees, as they would identify them with the St. Dominican Rebellion. Some St. Dominican refugees did attempt to perpetuate French Revolutionary ideas on their arrival into Louisiana, which American authorities feared. 

American fears were eventually confirmed; in 1805, Grandjean, a white St. Dominican, and his Dominican Creole accomplices attempted to incite a slave rebellion aimed at overthrowing the American government in Louisiana. The plan was foiled by New Orleanian Creoles of color who revealed the plot to American authorities. The Americans sentenced Grandjean and his accomplices to work on a slave chain-gang for the rest of their lives.

Rivalry between Louisiana Creoles and Anglo-Americans

The transfer of the French colony to the United States and the arrival of Anglo Americans from New England and the South resulted in a cultural confrontation. Some Americans were reportedly shocked by aspects of the culture and French-speaking society of the newly acquired territory: the predominance of the French language and Roman Catholicism, the free class of Creoles of color and the strong African traditions of slaves. They pressured the United States' first governor of the Louisiana Territory, W.C.C. Claiborne, to change it.

Particularly in the slave society of the Anglo-American South, slavery had become a racial caste. Since the late 17th century, children in the colonies took the status of their mothers at birth; therefore, all children of enslaved mothers were born into slavery, regardless of the race or status of their fathers. This produced many mixed-race slaves over the generations. Whites classified society into whites and blacks (the latter associated strongly with slaves). 

Although there was a growing population of free blacks, particularly in the Upper South, they generally did not have the same rights and freedoms as Creoles of color in Louisiana under French and Spanish rule, who held office and served in the militia. For example, around 80 Creoles of color were recruited into the militia that fought in the Battle of Baton Rouge in 1779. And 353 Creoles of color were recruited into the militia that fought in the Battle of New Orleans in 1812. Later on, some of the descendants of these Creole of color veterans of the Battle of New Orleans, like Caesar Antoine, went on to fight in the American Civil War.

When Claiborne made English the official language of the territory, the French Creoles of New Orleans were outraged, and reportedly paraded in protest in the streets. They rejected the Americans' effort to transform them overnight. In addition, upper-class French Creoles thought that many of the arriving Americans were uncouth, especially the rough Kentucky boatmen (Kaintucks) who regularly visited the city, having maneuvered flatboats down the Mississippi River filled with goods for market.

Realizing that he needed local support, Claiborne restored French as an official language. In all forms of government, public forums and in the Catholic Church, French continued to be used. Most importantly, Louisiana French and Louisiana Creole remained the languages of the majority of the population of the state, leaving English and Spanish as minority languages.

Louisiana Creole exceptionalism

Louisiana's development and growth was rapid after its admission as a member state of the American Union.

By 1850, one-third of all Creoles of color owned over $100,000 worth of property. Creoles of color were wealthy businessmen, entrepreneurs, clothiers, real estate developers, doctors, and other respected professions; they owned estates and properties in French Louisiana. Aristocratic Creoles of Color were very wealthy, such as Aristide Mary who owned more than $1,500,000 of property in the State of Louisiana.

Nearly all boys of wealthy Creole families were sent to France where they received an excellent classical education.

Being a French, and later Spanish colony, Louisiana maintained a three-tiered society that was very similar to other Latin American and Caribbean countries, with the three tiers: aristocracy, bourgeoisie, and peasantry. The blending of cultures and races created a society unlike any other in America.

Ethnic blend and race

During the Age of Discovery, native-born colonists were referred to as Creoles to distinguish them from the new arrivals of France, Spain, and Africa. Some Native Americans, such as the Choctaw people, also intermarried with Creoles.

Like "Cajun," the term "Creole" is a popular name used to describe cultures in the southern Louisiana area. "Creole" can be roughly defined as "native to a region," but its precise meaning varies according to the geographic area in which it is used. Generally, however, Creoles felt the need to distinguish themselves from the influx of American and European immigrants coming into the area after the Louisiana Purchase of 1803. "Creole" is still used to describe the heritage and customs of the various people who settled Louisiana during the early French colonial times. In addition to the French Canadians, the amalgamated Creole culture in southern Louisiana includes influences from the Chitimacha, Houma and other native tribes, West Africans, Spanish-speaking Isleños (Canary Islanders) and French-speaking Gens de couleur from the Caribbean.

As a group, mixed-race Creoles rapidly began to acquire education, skills (many in New Orleans worked as craftsmen and artisans), businesses and property. They were overwhelmingly Catholic, spoke Colonial French (although some also spoke Louisiana Creole), and maintained French social customs, modified by other parts of their ancestry and Louisiana culture. The Creoles of color often married among themselves to maintain their class and social culture.

Under the French and Spanish rulers, Louisiana developed a three-tiered society, similar to that of Saint-Domingue (Haiti), Cuba, Brazil, Saint Lucia, Martinique, Guadeloupe and other Latin colonies. This three-tiered society of multi-racial Creoles of European, African and Native American descent included an elite group of large landowners (grands habitants); a prosperous, educated urban group (bourgeoisie); and the far larger class of indentured servants (engagés), African slaves and Creole peasants (petits habitants). 

The status of Creoles of color (Gens de Couleur Libres) was one they guarded carefully. The American Union treated Creoles as a unique people due to the Louisiana Purchase Treaty of April 30, 1803. By law, Creoles of Color enjoyed most of the same rights and privileges as whites. They could and often did challenge the law in court and won cases against whites. They were property owners and created schools for their children. 

Race did not play as central a role as it does in Anglo-American culture: oftentimes, race was not a concern, but instead, family standing and wealth were key distinguishing factors in New Orleans and beyond. The Creole civil rights activist Rodolphe Desdunes explained the difference between Creoles and Anglo-Americans, concerning the widespread belief in racialism by the latter, as follows:

The groups (Latin and Anglo New Orleanians) had "two different schools of politics [and differed] radically ... in aspiration and method. One hopes [Latins], and the other doubts [Anglos]. Thus we often perceive that one makes every effort to acquire merits, the other to gain advantages. One aspires to equality, the other to identity. One will forget that he is a Negro to think that he is a man; the other will forget that he is a man to think that he is a Negro."

After the United States acquired the area in the Louisiana Purchase, mixed-race Creoles of color resisted American attempts to impose their binary racial culture. In the American South, slavery provided a racialized lens through which people with any African descent were considered lower in status than whites, effectively erasing the long-established triracial distinction in Louisiana between whites, blacks, and Creoles of color.

There was also a sizable German Creole group of full German descent, which centered on the parishes of St. Charles and St. John the Baptist. (It is for these settlers that the Côte des Allemands, "The German Coast," is named.) Over time, many of these groups assimilated into the dominant francophone Creole culture, often adopting the French language and customs.

Louisiana Creoles in Post-bellum Louisiana

While the American Civil War promised rights and opportunities for slaves, many Creoles of color who had long been free before the war worried about losing their identity and position. The Anglo-Americans did not legally recognize a three-tiered society; nevertheless, some Creoles of color such as Thomy Lafon, Victor Séjour and others, used their position to support the abolitionist cause. One Creole of color, Francis E. Dumas, emancipated his slaves and organized them into a company in the Second Regiment of the Federal Louisiana Native Guards. Alexander Dimitry was one of the few people of color to take on a leadership role within the Confederate Government. His son, John Dimitry, fought with the Confederate Louisiana Native Guards to defend the Creole State.

Following the Union victory in the Civil War, the Louisiana three-tiered society was gradually overrun by more Anglo-Americans, who classified everyone by the South's binary division of "black" and "white". During the Reconstruction era, Democrats regained power in the Louisiana state legislature by using paramilitary groups like the White League to suppress black voting. The Democrats enforced white supremacy by passing Jim Crow laws and a constitution near the turn of the 20th century that effectively disenfranchised most blacks and Creoles of color through discriminatory application of voter registration and electoral laws. 

Some Creoles, such as the ex-Confederate general Pierre Gustave Toutant-Beauregard, advocated against racism, and became proponents of black civil rights and black suffrage, involving themselves in the creation of the Louisiana Unification Movement that called for equal rights for blacks, denounced discrimination, and opposed segregation.

The U.S. Supreme Court ruling in Plessy v. Ferguson in 1896 supported the binary society and the policy of "separate but equal" facilities (which were seldom achieved in fact) in the segregated South. Some white Creoles, heavily influenced by white American society, increasingly claimed that the term Creole applied to whites only. According to Virginia R. Domínguez:

Charles Gayarré ... and Alcée Fortier ... led the outspoken though desperate defense of the Creole. As bright as these men clearly were, they still became engulfed in the reclassification process intent on salvaging white Creole status. Their speeches consequently read more like sympathetic eulogies than historical analysis.

Sybil Kein suggests that, because of the white Creoles struggle for redefinition, they were particularly hostile to the exploration by the writer George Washington Cable of the multi-racial Creole society in his stories and novels. She believes that in The Grandissimes, Cable exposed white Creoles' preoccupation with covering up blood connections with Creoles of color. Kein writes:

There was a veritable explosion of defenses of Creole ancestry. The more novelist George Washington Cable engaged his characters in family feuds over inheritance, embroiled them in sexual unions with blacks and mulattoes and made them seem particularly defensive about their presumably pure Caucasian ancestry, the more vociferously the white Creoles responded, insisting on purity of white ancestry as a requirement for identification as Creole.

In the 1930s, populist Governor Huey Long satirized such Creole claims, saying that you could feed all the "pure white" people in New Orleans with a cup of beans and a half a cup of rice, and still have food left over! The effort to impose Anglo-American binary racial classification on Creoles continued, however. In 1938, in Sunseri v. Cassagne—the Louisiana Supreme Court proclaimed traceability of African ancestry to be the only requirement for definition of colored. And during her time as Registrar of the Bureau of Vital Statistics for the City of New Orleans (1949–1965), Naomi Drake tried to impose these binary racial classifications. She unilaterally changed records to classify mixed-race individuals as black if she found they had any black (or African) ancestry, an application of hypodescent rules, and did not notify people of her actions.

Among the practices Drake directed was having her workers check obituaries. They were to assess whether the obituary of a person identified as white provided clues that might help show the individual was "really" black, such as having black relatives, services at a traditionally black funeral home, or burial at a traditionally black cemetery—evidence which she would use to ensure the death certificate classified the person as black. Not everyone accepted Drake's actions, and people filed thousands of cases against the office to have racial classifications changed and to protest her withholding legal documents of vital records. This caused much embarrassment and disruption, finally causing the city to fire her in 1965.

Louisiana French renaissance
In the wake of the "Cajun Renaissance" of the 1960s and 1970s, the (often racialized) Creole identity has traditionally received less attention than its Cajun counterpart. However, the late 2010s have seen a minor but notable resurgence of the Creole identity among linguistic activists of all races, including among white people whose parents or grandparents identify as Cajun or simply French. 

Contemporary French-language media in Louisiana, such as Télé-Louisiane or Le Bourdon de la Louisiane, often use the term Créole in its original and most inclusive sense (i.e. without reference to race), and some English-language organizations like the Historic New Orleans Collection have published articles questioning the racialized Cajun-Creole dichotomy of the mid-twentieth century. Documentaries such as Nathan Rabalais' Finding Cajun examine the intersection and impact of Creole culture on what is commonly described as Cajun, likewise questioning the validity of recent racialization.

Culture

Cuisine

Louisiana Creole cuisine is recognized as a unique style of cooking originating in New Orleans, starting in the early 1700s. It makes use of what is sometimes called the Holy trinity: onions, celery and green peppers. It has developed primarily from various European, African, and Native American historic culinary influences. A distinctly different style of Creole or Cajun cooking exists in Acadiana.

Gumbo (Gombô in Louisiana Creole, Gombo in Louisiana French) is a traditional Creole dish from New Orleans with French, Spanish, Native American, African, German, Italian, and Caribbean influences. It is a roux-based meat stew or soup, sometimes made with some combination of any of the following: seafood (usually shrimp, crabs, with oysters optional, or occasionally crawfish), sausage, chicken (hen or rooster), alligator, turtle, rabbit, duck, deer or wild boar. Gumbo is often seasoned with filé, which is dried and ground sassafras leaves. Both meat and seafood versions also include the "Holy Trinity" and are served like stew over rice. It developed from French colonists trying to make bouillabaisse with New World ingredients. Starting with aromatic seasonings, the French used onions and celery as in a traditional mirepoix, but lacked carrots, so they substituted green bell peppers. Africans contributed okra, traditionally grown in regions of Africa, the Middle East and Spain. Gombo is the Louisiana French word for okra, which is derived from a shortened version of the Bantu words kilogombó or kigambó, also guingambó or quinbombó. "Gumbo" became the anglicized version of the word 'Gombo' after the English language became dominant in Louisiana. In Louisiana French dialects, the word "gombo" still refers to both the hybrid stew and the vegetable. The Choctaw contributed filé; the Spanish contributed peppers and tomatoes; and new spices were adopted from Caribbean dishes. The French later favored a roux for thickening. In the 19th century, the Italians added garlic. After arriving in numbers, German immigrants dominated New Orleans city bakeries, including those making traditional French bread. They introduced having buttered French bread as a side to eating gumbo, as well as a side of German-style potato salad.

Jambalaya is the second of the famous Louisiana Creole dishes.

Today, jambalaya is commonly made with seafood (usually shrimp) or chicken, or a combination of shrimp and chicken. Most versions contain smoked sausage, more commonly used instead of ham in modern versions. However, a version of jambalaya that uses ham with shrimp may be closer to the original Creole dish.

Jambalaya is prepared in two ways: "red" and "brown". Red is the tomato-based version native to New Orleans; it is also found in parts of Iberia and St. Martin parishes, and generally uses shrimp or chicken stock. The red-style Creole jambalaya is the original version. The "brown" version is associated with Cajun cooking and does not include tomatoes.

Red beans and rice is a dish of Louisiana and Caribbean influence, originating in New Orleans. It contains red beans, the "holy trinity" of onion, celery, and bell pepper, and often andouille smoked sausage, pickled pork, or smoked ham hocks. The beans are served over white rice. It is one of the famous dishes in Louisiana, and is associated with "washday Monday". It could be cooked all day over a low flame while the women of the house attended to washing the family's clothes.

Music

Alphonse "Bois Sec" Ardoin
Zydeco (a transliteration in English of 'zaricô' (snapbeans) from the song, "Les haricots sont pas salés"), was born in black Creole communities on the prairies of southwest Louisiana in the 1920s. It is often considered the Creole music of Louisiana. Zydeco, a derivative of Cajun music, purportedly hails from Là-là, a genre of music now defunct, and old south Louisiana jurés.  As Louisiana French and Louisiana Creole was the lingua franca of the prairies of southwest Louisiana, zydeco was initially sung only in Louisiana French or Creole. Later, Louisiana Creoles, such as the 20th-century Chénier brothers, Andrus Espree (Beau Jocque), Rosie Lédet and others began incorporating a more bluesy sound and added a new linguistic element to zydeco music: English.  Today, zydeco musicians sing in English, Louisiana Creole or Colonial Louisiana French.

Today's Zydeco often incorporates a blend of swamp pop, blues, and/or jazz as well as "Cajun Music" (originally called Old Louisiana French Music).  An instrument unique to zydeco is a form of washboard called the frottoir or scrub board. This is a vest made of corrugated aluminum, and played by the musician working bottle openers, bottle caps or spoons up and down the length of the vest.  Another instrument used in both Zydeco and Cajun music since the 1800s is the accordion. Zydeco music makes use of the piano or button accordion while Cajun music is played on the diatonic accordion, or Cajun accordion, often called a "squeeze box".  Cajun musicians also use the fiddle and steel guitar more often than do those playing Zydeco.

Zydeco can be traced to the music of enslaved African people from the 19th century. It is represented in Slave Songs of the United States, first published in 1867. The final seven songs in that work are printed with melody along with text in Louisiana Creole. These and many other songs were sung by slaves on plantations, especially in St. Charles Parish, and when they gathered on Sundays at Congo Square in New Orleans.

Among the Spanish Creole people highlights, between their varied traditional folklore, the Canarian Décimas, romances, ballads and pan-Hispanic songs date back many years, even to the Medieval Age. This folklore was carried by their ancestors from the Canary Islands to Louisiana in the 18th century. It also highlights their adaptation to the Isleño music to other music outside of the community (especially from the Mexican Corridos).

Language

Louisiana Creole (Kréyol La Lwizyàn) is a French Creole language spoken by the Louisiana Creole people and sometimes Cajuns and Anglo-residents of the state of Louisiana. The language consists of elements of French, Spanish, African and Native American roots.

Louisiana French (LF) is the regional variety of the French language spoken throughout contemporary Louisiana by individuals who today identify ethno-racially as Creole, Cajun or French, as well as some who identify as Spanish (particularly in New Iberia and Baton Rouge, where the Creole people are a mix of French and Spanish and speak the French language), African-American, white, Irish or of other origins. Individuals and groups of individuals through innovation, adaptation, and contact continually enrich the French language spoken in Louisiana, seasoning it with linguistic features that can sometimes only be found in Louisiana.

Tulane University's Department of French and Italian website prominently declares "In Louisiana, French is not a foreign language".
Figures from U.S. decennial censuses report that roughly 250,000 Louisianans claimed to use or speak French in their homes.

Among the 18 governors of Louisiana between 1803 and 1865, six were French Creoles and spoke French: Jacques Villeré, Pierre Derbigny, Armand Beauvais, Jacques Dupré, Andre B. Roman and Alexandre Mouton.

According to the historian Paul Lachance, "the addition of white immigrants to the white creole population enabled French-speakers to remain a majority of the white population [in New Orleans] until almost 1830. If a substantial proportion of Creoles of color and slaves had not also spoken French, however, the Gallic community would have become a minority of the total population as early as 1820." In the 1850s, white Francophones remained an intact and vibrant community; they maintained instruction in French in two of the city's four school districts. In 1862, the Union general Ben Butler abolished French instruction in New Orleans schools, and statewide measures in 1864 and 1868 further cemented the policy. By the end of the 19th century, French usage in the city had faded significantly. However, as late as 1902 "one-fourth of the population of the city spoke French in ordinary daily intercourse, while another two-fourths was able to understand the language perfectly," and as late as 1945, one still encountered elderly Creole women who spoke no English. The last major French-language newspaper in New Orleans, L'Abeille de la Nouvelle-Orléans, ceased publication on December 27, 1923, after ninety-six years; according to some sources Le Courrier de la Nouvelle Orleans continued until 1955.

Today, it is generally in more rural areas that people continue to speak Louisiana French or Louisiana Creole.  Also during the '40s and '50s many Creoles left Louisiana to find work in Texas, mostly in Houston and East Texas. The language and music is widely spoken there;  the 5th ward of Houston was originally called Frenchtown due to that reason.  There were also Zydeco clubs started in Houston, like the famed Silver Slipper owned by a Creole named Alfred Cormier that has hosted the likes of Clifton Chenier and Boozoo Chavis.

On the other hand, Spanish usage has fallen markedly over the years among the Spanish Creoles. Still, in the first half of twentieth century, most of the people of Saint Bernard and Galveztown spoke the Spanish language with the Canarian Spanish dialect (the ancestors of these Creoles were from the Canary Islands) of the 18th century, but the government of Louisiana imposed the use of English in these communities, especially in the schools (e.g. Saint Bernard) where if a teacher heard children speaking Spanish she would fine them and punish them. Now, only some people over the age of 80 can speak Spanish in these communities. Most of the youth of Saint Bernard can only speak English.

New Orleans Mardi Gras

Mardi Gras (Fat Tuesday in English) in New Orleans, Louisiana, is a Carnival celebration well known throughout the world. It has colonial French roots.

The New Orleans Carnival season, with roots in preparing for the start of the Christian season of Lent, starts after Twelfth Night, on Epiphany (January 6). It is a season of parades, balls (some of them masquerade balls) and king cake parties. It has traditionally been part of the winter social season; at one time "coming out" parties for young women at débutante balls were timed for this season.

Celebrations are concentrated for about two weeks before and through Fat Tuesday (Mardi Gras in French), the day before Ash Wednesday. Usually there is one major parade each day (weather permitting); many days have several large parades. The largest and most elaborate parades take place the last five days of the season. In the final week of Carnival, many events large and small occur throughout New Orleans and surrounding communities.

The parades in New Orleans are organized by Carnival krewes. Krewe float riders toss throws to the crowds; the most common throws are strings of plastic colorful beads, doubloons (aluminum or wooden dollar-sized coins usually impressed with a krewe logo), decorated plastic throw cups, and small inexpensive toys. Major krewes follow the same parade schedule and route each year.

While many tourists center their Mardi Gras season activities on Bourbon Street and the French Quarter, none of the major Mardi Gras parades has entered the Quarter since 1972 because of its narrow streets and overhead obstructions. Instead, major parades originate in the Uptown and Mid-City districts and follow a route along St. Charles Avenue and Canal Street, on the upriver side of the French Quarter.

To New Orleanians, "Mardi Gras" specifically refers to the Tuesday before Lent, the highlight of the season. The term can also be used less specifically for the whole Carnival season, sometimes as "the Mardi Gras season". The terms "Fat Tuesday" or "Mardi Gras Day" always refer only to that specific day.

Creole cultures

Cajun Creoles

Cajuns as an ethnic group historically included Indians and Blacks. Black Louisiana Frenchmen have historically self-identified as Cajun, using the term in regards to the ethnicity of the Cajun Country and the language they speak: Amédé Ardoin for example spoke only Cajun French and at his height was known as the first Black Cajun recording artist; Clifton Chenier the King of Zydeco, routinely self-identified as a Black Cajun:

People of the Cajun Country have historically described what the Cajun nationality means to them; Brandon Moreau, a Cajun of Basile, Louisiana, described Cajun as an "inclusive term designating region, descent, or heritage – not race." Moreau also described an incident of where he used the term coonass with a good friend of his: "We were all talking in the hall, and I said I was a coonass. She said she was Cajun, but that she would never be a coonass. She's black and it offended her."

Cajun culture due to its mixed Latin-Creole nature had fostered more laissez-faire attitudes between blacks and whites in the Cajun Country more than anywhere else in the South. Roman Catholicism actively preached tolerance and condemned racism and all hate crimes; the Roman Church threatened to excommunicate any of its members who would dare to break its laws.

Anglo-Americans openly discriminated against Cajuns because they were Catholics, had a Latin Culture, and spoke Cajun French. White Cajuns and White Creoles accepted advances in racial equality, and they had compassion for Black Cajuns, Black Creoles, and African Americans. In the 1950's, twice as many blacks in Louisiana's French-Catholic parishes registered to vote compared to blacks in the Anglo-Protestant parishes.

Americanization of Acadiana (1950–1970)
When the United States of America began assimilating and Americanizing the parishes of the Cajun Country between the 1950s and 1970s, they imposed segregation and reorganized the inhabitants of the Cajun Country to identify racially as either "white" Cajuns or "black" Creoles. As the younger generations were made to abandon speaking French and French customs, the White or Indian Cajuns assimilated into the Anglo-American host culture, and the Black Cajuns assimilated into the African American culture.

Cajuns looked to the Civil Rights Movement and other Black liberation and empowerment movements as a guide to fostering Louisiana's French cultural renaissance. A Cajun student protester in 1968 declared "We're slaves to a system. Throw away the shackles... and be free with your brother."

Cane River Creoles

While the sophisticated Creole society of New Orleans has historically received much attention, the Cane River (Rivière aux Cannes) area developed its own strong Creole culture. Creole migrants from New Orleans and various ethnic groups including Africans, Spanish, Frenchmen, and Native Americans inhabited this region and mixed together in the 18th and early 19th centuries. The community is located in and around Isle Brevelle in lower Natchitoches Parish, Louisiana. There are many Creole communities within Natchitoches Parish, including Natchitoches, Cloutierville, Derry, Gorum and Natchez. Many of their historic plantations still exist. Some have been designated as National Historic Landmarks, and are noted within the Cane River National Heritage Area, as well as the Cane River Creole National Historical Park. Some plantations are sites on the Louisiana African American Heritage Trail.

The Cane River as well as Avoyelles and St. Landry Creole family surnames include but are not limited to: Antee, Anty, Arceneaux, Arnaud, Balthazar, Barre', Bayonne, Beaudoin, Bellow, Bernard, Biagas, Bossier, Boyér, Brossette, Buard, Byone, Carriere, Cassine, Catalon, Chevalier, Chretien, Christophe, Cloutier, Colson, Colston, Conde, Conant, Coutée, Cyriak, Cyriaque, Damas, DeBòis, DeCuir, Deculus, DeLouche, Delphin, De Sadier, De Soto, Dubreil, Dunn, Dupré. Esprit, Fredieu, Fuselier, Gallien, Goudeau, Gravés, Guillory, Hebert, Honoré, Hughes, LaCaze, LaCour, Lambre', Landry, Laurent, LéBon, Lefìls, Lemelle, LeRoux, Le Vasseur, Llorens, Mathés, Mathis, Métoyer, Mezière, Monette, Moran, Mullone, Pantallion, Papillion, Porche, PrudHomme, Rachal, Ray, Reynaud, Roque, Sarpy, Sers, Severin, Simien, St. Romain, St. Ville, Sylvie, Sylvan, Tournoir, Tyler, Vachon, Vallot, Vercher and Versher. (Most of the surnames are of French and sometimes Spanish origin).

Pointe Coupee Creoles
Another historic area to Louisiana is Pointe Coupee, an area northwest of Baton Rouge. This area is known for the False River; the parish seat is New Roads, and villages including Morganza are located off the river. This parish is known to be uniquely Creole; today a large portion of the nearly 22,000 residents can trace Creole ancestry. The area was noted for its many plantations and cultural life during the French, Spanish, and American colonial periods.

The population here had become bilingual or even trilingual with French, Louisiana Creole, and English because of its plantation business before most of Louisiana. The Louisiana Creole language is widely associated with this parish; the local mainland French and Creole (i.e., locally born) plantation owners and their African slaves formed it as communication language, which became the primary language for many Pointe Coupee residents well into the 20th century. The local white and black populations as well as people of blended ethnicity spoke the language, because of its importance to the region; Italian immigrants in the 19th century often adopted the language.

Common Creole family names of the region include the following: Aguillard, Bergeron, Bonaventure, Boudreaux, Carmouche, Chenevert, Christophe, Darensbourg, Decuir, Domingue, Duperon, Eloi, Elloie, Ellois,Ellsworth, Fabre, Francois, Gaines, Gremillion, Guerin, Honoré, Jarreau, Joseph, Lacour, Morel, Olinde, Patin, Polard, Porche, Pourciau, Purnell, Ricard, St. Amant, St. Romain, Tounoir, Valéry and dozens more.

Brian J. Costello, an 11th generation Pointe Coupee Parish Creole, is the premiere historian, author and archivist on Pointe Coupee's Creole population, language, social and material culture. Most of his 19 solely-authored books, six co-authored books and numerous feature articles and participation in documentaries since 1987 have addressed these topics. He was immersed in the area's Louisiana Creole dialect in his childhood, through inter-familial and community immersion and is, therefore, one of the dialect's most fluent, and last, speakers.

Avoyelles Parish Creoles 
Avoyelles Parish has a history rich in Creole ancestry. Marksville has a significant populace of French Creoles. The languages that are spoken are Louisiana French and English. This parish was established in 1750. The Creole community in Avoyelles parish is alive and well and has a unique blend of family, food and Creole culture. Creole family names of this region are: Auzenne, Barbin, Beridon, Beaudoin, Biagas, Bonton, Bordelon, Boutte, Broussard, Carriere, Chargois, DeBellevue, DeCuir, Deshotels, Dufour, DuCote, Esprit, Fontenot, Fuselier, Gaspard, Gauthier, Goudeau, Greenhouse, Gremillion,Guillory, Lamartiniere, Lemelle, Lemoine, LeRoux, Mayeux, Mouton, Moten, Muellon, Normand, Perrie, Rabalais, Ravarre, Saucier, Sylvan, Tounouir and Tyler. A French Creole Heritage day has been held annually in Avoyelles Parish on Bastille Day since 2012.

Evangeline Parish Creoles 
Evangeline Parish was formed out of the northwestern part of St. Landry Parish in 1910, and is therefore, a former part of the old Poste des Opelousas territory. Most of this region's population was a direct result of the North American Creole & Métis influx of 1763, the result of the end of the French & Indian War which saw former French colonial settlements from as far away as "Upper Louisiana" (Great Lakes region, Indiana, Illinois) to "Lower Louisiana's" (Illinois, Arkansas, Louisiana, Mississippi and Alabama), ceded to the Thirteen Colonies. 
The majority of these French Creoles and Métis peoples chose to leave their former homes electing to head for the only 'French' exempted settlement area in Lower Louisiana, the "Territory of Orleans" or the modern State of Louisiana.
 
These Creoles and Métis families generally did not remain in New Orleans and opted for settlement in the northwestern "Creole parishes" of higher ground. This area reaches upwards to Pointe Coupee, St. Landry, Avoyelles and what became Evangeline Parish in 1910. Along with these diverse Métis & Creole families came West Indian slaves (Caribbean people).

Still later, Dominican Creoles, Napoleonic soldiers, and 19th century French families would also settle this region. One of Napoleon Bonaparte's adjutant majors is actually considered the founder of Ville Platte, the parish seat of Evangeline Parish. General Antoine Paul Joseph Louis Garrigues de Flaugeac and his fellow Napoleonic soldiers, Benoit DeBaillon, Louis Van Hille, and Wartelle's descendants also settled in St. Landry Parish and became important public, civic, and political figures. They were discovered on the levee in tattered uniforms by a wealthy Creole planter, "Grand Louis' Fontenot of St. Landry (and what is now, Evangeline Parish), a descendant of one Jean Louis Fonteneau, one of Governor Jean-Baptiste Le Moyne, Sieur de Bienville's French officers from Fort Toulouse, in what is now the State of Alabama.

Many Colonial French, Swiss German, Austrian, and Spanish Creole surnames still remain among prominent and common families alike in Evangeline Parish. Some later Irish and Italian names also appear. Surnames such as, Ardoin, Aguillard, Mouton, Bordelon, Boucher, Brignac, Brunet, Buller (Buhler), Catoire, Chapman, Coreil, Darbonne, David, DeBaillion, Deshotel, DeVille, DeVilliers, Duos, Dupre', Esprit, Estillette, Fontenot, Guillory, Gradney, LaFleur, Landreneau, LaTour, LeBas, LeBleu, Ledoux, Ledet, LeRoux, Manuel,  Milano-Hebert, Miller, Morein, Moreau, Moten, Mounier, Ortego, Perrodin, Pierotti, Pitre (rare Acadian-Creole), Rozas, Saucier, Schexnayder, Sebastien, Sittig, Soileau, Vidrine, Vizinat and many more are reminiscent of the late French Colonial, early Spanish and later American period of this region's history.

As of 2013, the parish was once again recognized by the March 2013 Regular Session of the Louisiana Legislature as part of the Creole Parishes, with the passage of SR No. 30. Other parishes so recognized include Avoyelles, St. Landry Parish and Pointe Coupee Parishes. Natchitoches Parish also remains recognized as "Creole".

Evangeline Parish's French-speaking Senator, Eric LaFleur sponsored SR No. 30 which was written by Louisiana French Creole scholar, educator and author, John laFleur II. The parish's namesake of "Evangeline" is a reflection of the affection the parish's founder, Paulin Fontenot had for Henry Wadsworth's famous poem of the same name, and not an indication of the parish's ethnic origin. The adoption of "Cajun" by the residents of this parish reflects both the popular commerce as well as media conditioning, since this northwestern region of the French-speaking triangle was never part of the Acadian settlement region of the Spanish period.

The community now hosts an annual "Creole Families Bastille Day (weekend) Heritage & Honorarium Festival in which a celebration of Louisiana's multi-ethnic French Creoles is held, with Catholic mass, Bastille Day Champagne toasting of honorees who've worked in some way to preserve and promote the French Creole heritage and language traditions. Louisiana authors, Creole food, and cultural events featuring scholarly lectures and historical information along with fun for families with free admission, and vendor booths are also a feature of this very interesting festival which unites all French Creoles who share this common culture and heritage.

St. Landry Parish Creoles 
St. Landry Parish has a significant population of Creoles, especially in Opelousas and its surrounding areas. The traditions and Creole heritage are prevalent in Opelousas, Port Barre, Melville, Palmetto, Lawtell, Eunice, Swords, Mallet, Frilot Cove, Plaisance, Pitreville, and many other villages, towns and communities. The Roman Catholic Church and French/Creole language are dominant features of this rich culture. Zydeco musicians host festivals all through the year.

Notable people

See also

 Creoles of color
 Cane River Creole National Historical Park
 Criollo
 Melrose Plantation
 French Quarter
 Faubourg Marigny
 Tremé
 Little New Orleans
 Frenchtown, Houston
 Magnolia Springs, Alabama
 Institute Catholique
 7th Ward of New Orleans
 Jean Lafitte National Historical Park and Preserve
 Native Americans in the United States
 Isleños
 Spanish Americans
 French Americans
 Canarian Americans
 Mexicans
 St. Dominicans
 African Americans
 African Americans in Louisiana
 French Louisianians

Explanatory notes

References

Further reading
 Brasseaux, Carl A. Acadian to Cajun: Transformation of a people, 1803–1877 (Univ. Press of Mississippi, 1992)
 Eaton, Clement. The Growth of Southern Civilization, 1790–1860 (1961) pp 125–49, broad survey
 Eble, Connie. "Creole in Louisiana." South Atlantic Review (2008): 39–53. in JSTOR
 Gelpi Jr, Paul D. "Mr. Jefferson's Creoles: The Battalion d'Orléans and the Americanization of Creole Louisiana, 1803–1815." Louisiana History (2007): 295–316. in JSTOR
 Landry, Rodrigue, Réal Allard, and Jacques Henry. "French in South Louisiana: towards language loss." Journal of Multilingual and Multicultural Development  (1996) 17#6 pp: 442–468.
 Stivale, Charles J. Disenchanting les bons temps: identity and authenticity in Cajun music and dance (Duke University Press, 2002)
 Tregle, Joseph G. "Early New Orleans Society: A Reappraisal." Journal of Southern History (1952) 18#1 pp: 20–36. in JSTOR

External links

French Creoles
Quadroons for Beginners: Discussing the Suppressed and Sexualized History of Free Women of Color with Author Emily Clark
I Am What I Say I Am: Racial and Cultural Identity among Creoles of Color in New Orleans
The creole people of New Orleans
Creole spirit
Cast From Their Ancestral Home, Creoles Worry About Culture's Future
'Faerie Folk' Strike Back With Fritters
Left Coast Creole
LA Creole
CreoleGen
Nsula.edu: Louisiana Creole Heritage Center website
Loyno.edu: "Creoles" — Kate Chopin website.
Cajun | American ethnic group | Britannica Cajun - American ethnic group

Louisiana Creole people
Louisiana Creole
Louisiana Creole culture
Creole peoples
African-American culture
African-American history of Louisiana
African-American society
American people of Creole descent
American people of French descent
American people who self-identify as being of Native American descent
Ethnic groups in Louisiana
French-American culture
French-American history
French diaspora in North America
Native American culture
Native American history
People from Louisiana
People of Colonial Spanish Louisiana
Spanish-American culture
Spanish-American history
People of Louisiana (New France)